The  ÚV vz. 38, manufacturer's designation Škoda A7, was a 37 mm tank gun designed by the Skoda Works in Czechoslovakia prior to World War II.

The gun was the primary armament of the Czech LT vz. 38 light tank, known in German service as the Panzer 38(t).

The primary user of the A7 was the Wehrmacht during World War II where the weapon went by the name  Kampfwagenkanone 38(t).

Performance
In German service, in addition to conventional high explosive ammunition, the weapon fired two anti-tank rounds.

References

See also

 Weapons of Czechoslovakia interwar period

 List of World War II artillery

World War II artillery
37 mm artillery
World War II tank guns
Tank guns of Czechoslovakia
Military equipment introduced in the 1930s